Beauharnois—Salaberry is a former federal electoral district in Quebec, Canada, that was represented in the House of Commons of Canada from 1949 to 2015.

Geography

In 2003, the riding was re-defined to consist of the regional county municipalities of Beauharnois—Salaberry, Les Jardins-de-Napierville, and Le Haut-Saint-Laurent, including the parts of Akwesasne Indian Reserve No. 15 that lie within Quebec. In the 2006 census 88.7% of its population reported French only as their home language, 9.3% English (mostly in Le Haut-Saint-Laurent).

The neighbouring ridings were Stormont—Dundas—South Glengarry, Vaudreuil—Soulanges, Châteauguay—Saint-Constant, Brossard—La Prairie, and Saint-Jean.

History
Beauharnois riding was created in the British North America Act of 1867. Beauharnois was merged into Beauharnois—Laprairie in 1932.

In 1947, Beauharnois riding was re-created from Beauharnois—Laprairie and Châteauguay—Huntingdon.

In 1952, it became Beauharnois—Salaberry.

See Beauharnois for information on the riding prior to 1952.

The name of the riding was changed back to Beauharnois from 1966 to 1971, and from 1976 to 1977. The rest of time it was known as "Beauharnois—Salaberry" as it is known as today.

In 1952, Beauharnois—Salaberry consisted of the county of Beauharnois, the cities of Salaberry-de-Valley field and Beauharnois and the town of Maple Grove, the municipality of Saint-Joachim-de-Châteauguay, the towns of Châteauguay, Châteauguay Heights, and De Léry, and the municipalities of Saint-Anicet and Sainte Barbe.

Beauharnois—Salaberry was abolished in 1966 and redistributed between Beauharnois electoral district and La Prairie (electoral district)

Beauharnois—Salaberry was re-created in 1971 when Beauharnois was renamed. It consisted of the Cities of Beauharnois and Salaberry-de-Valleyfield, the Towns of Huntingdon and Maple Grove, the County of Beauharnois, and parts of the Counties of Châteauguay and Huntingdon.

Beauharnois—Salaberry was abolished in 1976, and redistributed between Beauharnois and Châteauguay (electoral district), but in 1977, before any election was held, Beauharnois was renamed as Beauharnois—Salaberry. It consisted of the Cities of Beauharnois and Salaberry-de-Valleyfield, the Towns of Huntingdon and Maple Grove, and parts of the Counties of Beauharnois, Châteauguay and Huntingdon.

In 1987, the riding was re-defined to consist of the towns of Beauharnois, Huntingdon, Léry, Maple Grove and Salaberry-de-Valleyfield, the counties of Beauharnois and Huntingdon, and the County of Châteauguay excluding the towns of Châteauguay and Mercier.

In 1996, the riding was re-defined to consist of the cities of Beauharnois, Huntingdon, Maple Grove and Salaberry-de-Valleyfield, and the County Regional Municipalities of Beauharnois—Salaberry, Le Haut-Saint-Laurent (including that part of the Akwesasne Indian Reserve contained in the Province of Quebec) and Les Jardins-de-Napierville, excepting: the City of Saint-Rémi; the parish municipalities of Saint-Édouard, Saint-Jacques-le-Mineur and Saint-Michel.

It was abolished for the 2015 election.

Members of Parliament

This riding has elected the following Members of Parliament:

Electoral history

Beauharnois—Salaberry 1971 - 2015

 		

Note: Conservative vote is compared to the total of the Canadian Alliance vote and Progressive Conservative vote in 2000 election.

		

Note: Social Credit vote is compared to Ralliement créditiste vote in the 1968 election.

Beauharnois 1966 - 1971

Beauharnois—Salaberry 1952 - 1966

Note: Ralliement créditiste vote is compared to Social Credit vote in the 1963 election.

	

		

See Beauharnois for information on the riding prior to 1952.

See also
 List of Canadian federal electoral districts
 Past Canadian electoral districts

References

2011 Results from Elections Canada
Campaign expense data from Elections Canada

Map of riding as archived by Elections Canada

Notes

Former federal electoral districts of Quebec
Salaberry-de-Valleyfield